Québec-Est may refer to:
 Quebec East, a former federal electoral district in the area of Quebec City
 Québec-Est (provincial electoral district), a former provincial electoral district in the area of Quebec City